Earl Pastko is an American actor known for his roles in theatre, film and television.

Early life 
Pastko was born and raised in Chicago and moved to Canada in 1985. He currently resides in Toronto.

Career 
Pastko is a founding member of Chicago's Remains Theater Company. He worked extensively in theatre with noted directors Ken McDougall, Paul Bettis, Alexander Hausvater, Brian Quirt, Vikki Anderson and Morris Panych, among others. Pastko received a Dora nomination for his performance in La Ronde and a Jessie nomination for The Ends of The Earth. His most recent stage appearances were as Lars in The Company Theatre's production of Festen and as Alexander Stern in The Rant, presented by Chicago's Mary Arrcher Theatre Co.

His best known film roles are as Satan in Bruce McDonald's Highway 61; as Hartley Otis in Atom Egoyan's The Sweet Hereafter; as the artist in Jeremy Podeswa's Eclipse; and the hotel detective in David Weaver's Century Hotel. Pastko worked with George A. Romero (Land of the Dead); Eugene Levy (Sodbusters); and Roger Christian (Masterminds and Battlefield Earth).

Pastko's television appearances include Street Justice, Highlander, Street Legal, Kung Fu, Lonesome Dove, Poltergeist, Lexx, Stargate, La Femme Nikita, Once A Thief, The Eleventh Hour, This Is Wonderland, Zixx, Living in Your Car and The Murdoch Mysteries.

Filmography

Film

Television

References

External links 

1965 births
Living people
20th-century American male actors
20th-century Canadian male actors
21st-century American male actors
21st-century Canadian male actors
American emigrants to Canada
American male film actors
American male television actors
American male voice actors
Canadian male film actors
Canadian male television actors
Canadian male voice actors
Male actors from Chicago